Wenquan Township is a township in Changning County in western Yunnan province, China. , it has 10 villages under its administration.

References 

Township-level divisions of Baoshan, Yunnan